Fyodor Grigorievich Uglov (5 October (O.S. 22 September) 1904 – 22 June 2008) was a Soviet and Russian surgeon. In 1994 he was listed by Guinness World Records as the oldest practicing surgeon in the world. He retired from practice at the age of 102.

Biography
Uglov was born into a peasant family in Siberia near Lake Baikal. Having matriculated from the Saratov State University in 1929, he later settled in Leningrad, where he saved lives of soldiers wounded during the Winter War. He worked as a surgeon in Leningrad throughout its epic 900-day siege by the Germans, "performing surgery – often without anaesthetic, electricity or water – as the bombs rained all around". At the age of 60 he married a woman half his age.

Uglov gained a measure of renown in the 1970s with a series of publications and tracts campaigning against alcoholism (e.g., "Suicides"). He was on the cutting edge of Mikhail Gorbachev's ill-fated prohibition campaign, touring the country with his lectures and winning a Lenin Prize for his activities. Uglov retired from medical practice at the age of 102.

References

External links 
  
 Unofficial website 

1904 births
2008 deaths
People from Kirensky District
People from Irkutsk Governorate
Russian surgeons
Academicians of the USSR Academy of Medical Sciences
Academicians of the Russian Academy of Medical Sciences
Russian centenarians
Men centenarians
Soviet inventors
Lenin Prize winners
Soviet surgeons
20th-century surgeons
20th-century Russian physicians
Burials at Nikolskoe Cemetery
21st-century surgeons
21st-century Russian physicians